The Hollywood Central Park is a proposed cap cover park over US Highway 101 in Los Angeles, California, US.

History
The park idea was first proposed by Hollywood resident Edward V. Hunt. Advocacy group "Friends of the Hollywood Park" was formed in 2009, a non-profit group.

Funding
The project was proposed by the Hollywood Chamber of Commerce in 2006. They proposed 38-acre park will "cap" the Hollywood Freeway. Total cost of the project has been projected as much as $1 billion. Funding for an [environmental impact study] has been received from various sources since 2008. $1.2 million was received from the Aileen Getty Foundation and $1.53 Million from CRA/LA Excess Bond funds among other donations.

Parkscape
The park would stretch along the freeway from Bronson Avenue bridge south to Santa Monica Boulevard bridge.

References

External links
Hollywood Central Park website

Parks in Los Angeles
Proposed parks in the United States
U.S. Route 101